William Howard, styled by courtesy Viscount Andover (23 December 1714 – 15 July 1756), of Elford Hall, Staffordshire, was British Tory politician who sat in the House of Commons from 1737 to 1747.

Early life
Howard was the eldest surviving son of Henry Bowes Howard, 11th Earl of Suffolk and his wife  Catherine Graham, daughter of Colonel James Grahme and Dorothy Howard. From 1725 to 1728 he was educated at Eton College. He married Lady Mary Finch, daughter of Heneage Finch, 2nd Earl of Aylesford on 6 November 1736.

Career
Andover was returned unopposed as a Tory Member of Parliament for Castle Rising at a by-election on 16 April 1737. He voted against theeGovernment on the Spanish convention in 1739 and on the place bill of 1740. In February 1741, he was one of the Tories who withdrew on the motion for Walpole's dismissal. He was returned unopposed at the 1741 British general election but did not stand in 1747.

Death and legacy
Andover died on 15 July 1756. He and his wife had a son Henry and three daughters, one of whom (Frances) married Richard Bagot (later Howard), son of Sir Walter Bagot, 5th Baronet.

References

1714 births
1756 deaths
People educated at Eton College
Heirs apparent who never acceded
William
Tory MPs (pre-1834)
British MPs 1734–1741
British MPs 1741–1747
Members of the Parliament of Great Britain for English constituencies
British courtesy viscounts